Oliver William Rafferty (born October 30, 1873 in Pittsburgh, Pennsylvania) was an early professional football player. In 1893 he was under contract by the Allegheny Athletic Association to be paid $50 per game for the entire season. He returned to Allegheny in 1894 to help the club win the Western Pennsylvania Championship. In 1895 Rafferty was poised to return to play for Allegheny, however the club cancelled their season after learning of an investigation, by Amateur Athletic Union, into reports that the team had secretly paid its players.

References

External links

1873 births
Players of American football from Pennsylvania
Allegheny Athletic Association players
Year of death missing
19th-century players of American football